Gallop and Ride is a horse-themed video game for the Nintendo Wii, developed by Austrian studio Sproing Interactive Media GmbH, and published by THQ in 2008.

Overview

The main objective of the game is to renovate the ranch for visiting guests and clients. The player is given the ranch, and is tasked with restoring it to its former glory.

Gameplay

Gameplay is centered around training and caring for your horse, and upgrading ranch facilities. You can feed, groom, breed, and train your horse. Once horses are sufficiently trained and groomed, they can be entered into competitions.

You and Your Horse

There are three horse breeds available in game: Friesian, Hanoverian, and Andalusian, and seven colors: black, white, gray, bay, red, cream, and palomino. Colors can be arranged in six different patterns: black hair (mane and tail), solid, pinto, dapple, socks, and stripes. The gender of horses is not selectable, as all of the player's horses are female and can be mated with rented studs through the breeding center. The player is customizable as well, with several different outfits available, some of which are unlocked as the game progresses.

See also

 Paws and Claws: Pet Vet
 Horsez
 Barbie Horse Adventures
 My Horse & Me
 My Horse & Me 2

Horse-related video games
Video games developed in Austria
Virtual pet video games
THQ games
Wii games
Wii-only games
2008 video games
Sproing Interactive games